Silverthorn Collegiate Institute (SCI, Silverthorn) is a public high school in Toronto, Ontario, Canada. It is located in the neighbourhood of Markland Wood in the former suburb of Etobicoke. It is under the sanction of the Toronto District School Board (the successor to the former Etobicoke Board of Education). The name comes from the Silverthorn Woods that borders to the south and the west. This was the northern limit of an old property known locally as the Silverthorn Mill Farm.

History
The Silverthorn name, in coming from the Somerset/Wiltshire county areas of Southwest England, have this surname originating from the Holy Thorn of Glastonbury.  The first Silverthorns to come to North America seems to have arrived and settled in New Jersey (and Virginia) well before the American Revolution. The New Jersey branch lost all of their land holdings since they were 'loyalists' and came to Canada, receiving land grants via the United Empire Loyalist grants. Although there is no 'official' coat of arms for this surname, there is a very old 'unofficial' one (from the Bristol/Bathe area of Wiltshire County, England) that often surfaces.  Researchers of this surname state that there are more Silverthorn's in the Toronto white pages and surrounding cemeteries than any other area in the world.  Please refer to the 1982 Silverthorn History published by Frank Fremont Reed, with the English Origins co-authored by William D Silverthorn (both of California, USA).

When the Markland Wood's area was developed in the early 1960s, the Etobicoke Board of Education (the forerunner of the TDSB) decided to build a secondary school for the area. The school was to be named Silverthorn Collegiate Institute after the family who had first settled the area. The cornerstone was laid in 1963, and the school opened in September 1964 with a teaching staff of 24 and a support staff of 7. The building was designed by Dunlop, Wardell, Matsui & Aitken Architects. Murray Young was the first principal. The school had only grades 9, 10, and 11 in 1964. In the next two years, it added grades 12 and 13. In 1968-69 the school was doubled in size, with the addition of an auditorium, the library, science labs and technical and business areas. A second gym was added later on.

SCI is a semestered school. Days run from 8:55 am to 3:10 pm. There is a two-day cycle, with Day 1 falling on any date of odd number, and Day 2 falling on any date of even number.

Silverthorn's colours are garnet, green, and silver and its mascot is a Spartan. The school's motto is "Nil Veretur Veritas" which is Latin for "The Truth Fears Nothing".

Sports 
Silverthorn C.I. boasts a number of high-level sports athletes, as the school is one of few with a high-performers (HP) sports program. The Silverthorn HP program offers students balancing school and intense training schedules, a flexible timetable to balance commitments, allowing students to strive for athletic excellence while maintaining academic achievement. Depending on training schedules, the students may attend school for a half-day in order to practice the other half. 

Sports included: Hockey, Gymnastics, Swimming, Rowing, Soccer, Football, Track & Field, Tennis, Volleyball, Baseball, Skiing and much more.

Arts 
At Silverthorn, they also place a focus on the Arts through a Specialist High Skills Major in Arts and Culture (SHSM). SHSM is a program that allows students to choose to specialize in learning in the arts (performing arts, visual arts, dance and/or music) while meeting the requirements of their Ontario Secondary School Diploma. SHSM also assists in the transitions to college, apprenticeship, university and the workplace by allowing students to learn hands-on, with creative liberty. 

SIlverthorn's SHSM program offers a number of customized learning opportunities in the arts, including attending arts focused workshops, visiting post-secondary art institutions, and watching guest speakers, and more. 

Furthermore, students completing the SHSM programme will earn an 'Arts and Culture' designation on their Ontario Secondary School Diploma as recognition of their hard-work and achievement.

Notable alumni 
Will Cuylle, professional hockey player
Elfi Schlegel, gymnast and sportscaster
Kiefer Sutherland, actor
Estella Warren, actress
Steve Gilchrist, former Member of Provincial Parliament in Ontario
Brittany MacLean, 400m Freestyle Olympic Swimmer (Qualified for the 2012 Summer Olympics in London).
Nikola Kalinic (Canadian football), professional Canadian Football player
Allan McShane, professional Canadian Hockey player 
Llevi Noel, professional Canadian Football player

See also
List of high schools in Ontario

External links
Silverthorn Collegiate Institute website
HP Program website 
TDSB Profile
Library website

Educational institutions established in 1964
High schools in Toronto
Education in Etobicoke
Schools in the TDSB
1964 establishments in Ontario